Raval River is a river in western India in Gujarat whose origin is Gir forest. Its drainage basin has a maximum length of 67 km.

References

Rivers of Gujarat
Rivers of India